Library of Arabic Literature offers Arabic editions and English translations of significant works of Arabic literature from the seventh to nineteenth centuries. "Our aim is to revive and reintroduce classic Arabic literature to a whole new generation of Arabs and non-Arabs, and make it more accessible and readable to everyone."  "Currently very few texts from this great corpus of literature have been translated." The books are edited and translated by distinguished Arabic and Islamic scholars from around the world, and are made available in hardcover parallel-text format with Arabic and English on facing pages, as English-only paperbacks, and as downloadable Arabic editions. For some texts, the series also publishes separate scholarly editions with full critical apparatus. Genres include poetry and prose, fiction, religion, philosophy, law, science, history, and travel writing. The series is published by NYU Press and supported by a grant from the New York University Abu Dhabi Institute.

The first volume was published in December 2012. Similar dual-language classic series by other publishers include the Loeb Classical Library for Europe and the Clay Sanskrit Library for India.

The Editorial Board includes Philip F. Kennedy of New York University, who serves as the General Editor; James E. Montgomery, Sir Thomas Adams’s Professor of Arabic at the University of Cambridge, and Shawkat M. Toorawa, Professor of Arabic at Yale University, who serve as the Executive Editors; and Julia Bray (University of Oxford), Michael Cooperson (University of California, Los Angeles), Joseph E. Lowry (University of Pennsylvania), Tahera Qutbuddin (University of Chicago), Devin J. Stewart (Emory University), Sean Anthony (Ohio State University), and Maurice Pomerantz (New York University Abu Dhabi), who serve as Editors. In addition, an International Advisory Board offers guidance for the series as a whole.

Publications
As of 2018, the Library of Arabic Literature has published more than thirty bilingual hardcover edition-translations and more than a dozen English-only paperbacks. Arabic-only PDFs are also available for download from the website for free.

Its award-winning edition-translations include Leg Over Leg by Ahmad Faris al-Shidyaq, edited and translated by Humphrey Davies, which was shortlisted for the American Literary Translators Association's 2016 National Translation Award and longlisted for the 2014 Best Translated Book Award, organized by Open Letter; Virtues of the Imam Ahmad ibn Hanbal by Ibn al-Jawzi, edited and translated by Michael Cooperson, which won the Sheikh Hamad Award for Translation and International Understanding in 2016; and The Epistle of Forgiveness by Al-Ma'arri, edited and translated by Geert Jan van Gelder and Gregor Schoeler, which won the Sheikh Hamad Award for Translation and International Understanding in 2015.

List of International Advisory Board Members 

 Muhammad Abdel-Haleem (School of Oriental & African Studies, University of London)
 Roger Allen (University of Pennsylvania)
 Anthony Appiah (New York University)
 Aziz al-Azmeh (Central European University, Budapest)
 Zvi Ben-Dor Benite (New York University)
 Peter Cole (Jerusalem and New Haven)
 Humphrey Davies (Cairo)
 Nadia El Cheikh (American University of Beirut)
 Geert Jan van Gelder (University of Oxford)
 Antonella Ghersetti (Università Ca’ Foscari, Venice)
 H.E. Omar Sayf Ghobash (UAE)
 Beatrice Gruendler (Free University of Berlin)
 Dimitri Gutas (Yale University)
 Robert Hoyland (New York University)
 Robert Irwin (London)
 Sherman Jackson (University of Southern California)
 Marion Katz (New York University)
 Jane Dammen McAuliffe (Bryn Mawr College)
 Angelika Neuwirth (Freie Universität, Berlin)
 Zaki Nusseibeh (The Office of Presidential Affairs, Abu Dhabi)
 Wen-chin Ouyang (School of Oriental & African Studies, University of London)
 Wadad al-Qadi (University of Chicago)
 Tim Reiss (New York University)
 Chase F. Robinson (The Graduate Center of The City University of New York)
 Everett Rowson (New York University)
 Michael Sells (University of Chicago)
 Richard Sieburth (New York University)
 Ali bin Tamim (Sheikh Zayed Book Award, Abu Dhabi)
 David Waines (Lancaster University)
 Marina Warner (Birkbeck College, University of London)

References

External links
Library of Arabic Literature, official website
Official Blog 
LAL at NYU Press

Dual-language series of texts
Arabic literature
Translations into English